Appin Road is a New South Wales secondary highway linking Campbelltown and Sydney's western suburbs with Wollongong. It gets its name from Appin, which lies on its path.

Route
Appin Road starts in Campbelltown and heads south to Appin, before continuing in a south-easterly direction to the Illawarra region just north of Bulli.

History
The passing of the Main Roads Act of 1924 through the Parliament of New South Wales provided for the declaration of Main Roads, roads partially funded by the State government through the Main Roads Board (later the Department of Main Roads, and eventually Transport for NSW). Main Road No. 177 was declared along this road on 8 August 1928, from the intersection with Narellan Road in Campbelltown, via Appin to the intersection with Princes Highway near the top of Bull Pass (and continuing north along Campbelltown Road to the intersection with Hume Highway at Crossroads).

The route was allocated State Route 69 in 1974. With the conversion to the newer alphanumeric system in 2013, this was replaced with route B69.

See also

 Highways in Australia
 Highways in New South Wales

References

Highways in New South Wales
Highways in Sydney
Wollongong